North Claines is a civil parish in Wychavon district, Worcestershire, England, immediately north of the city of Worcester. It includes the settlements of Fernhill Heath, Bevere, Lower Town, and Hawford. It is bordered to the west and north west by the River Severn and the River Salwarpe, with the Droitwich Canal running parallel to the Salwarpe.

The parish was formed in 1885 when the southern part of the parish of Claines was incorporated into Worcester under the Worcester Incorporation Act.

At the 2021 census the parish had a population of 4,460.

The parish has a parish council, the lowest level of local government. It is part of Lovett and North Claines  ward (which had a 2021 population of 7,647) for elections to Wychavon district council.

 there are 30 listed buildings in the parish: Bevere House and the Mill Hall at grade II* and 28 including bridges, houses and a canal lock, at grade II.

References

Further reading

Civil parishes in Worcestershire
Wychavon